United Nations Security Council Resolution 209, adopted on September 4, 1965, with a deteriorating situation along the cease-fire line in Kashmir, the Council called upon both India and Pakistan to take all steps necessary to immediately cease fighting and return to their respective sides of the line.  The Council also called on the two governments to co-operate fully with the United Nations Military Observer Group in Pakistan and asked the Secretary-General to report back on the implementation of the resolution within three days.

The resolution was adopted unanimously.

See also
Indo-Pakistani War of 1965
Kashmir conflict
List of United Nations Security Council Resolutions 201 to 300 (1965–1971)

References

Text of the Resolution at undocs.org

External links
 

 0209
Indo-Pakistani War of 1965
 0209
September 1965 events